= Jimin Han =

Korean-born American novelist

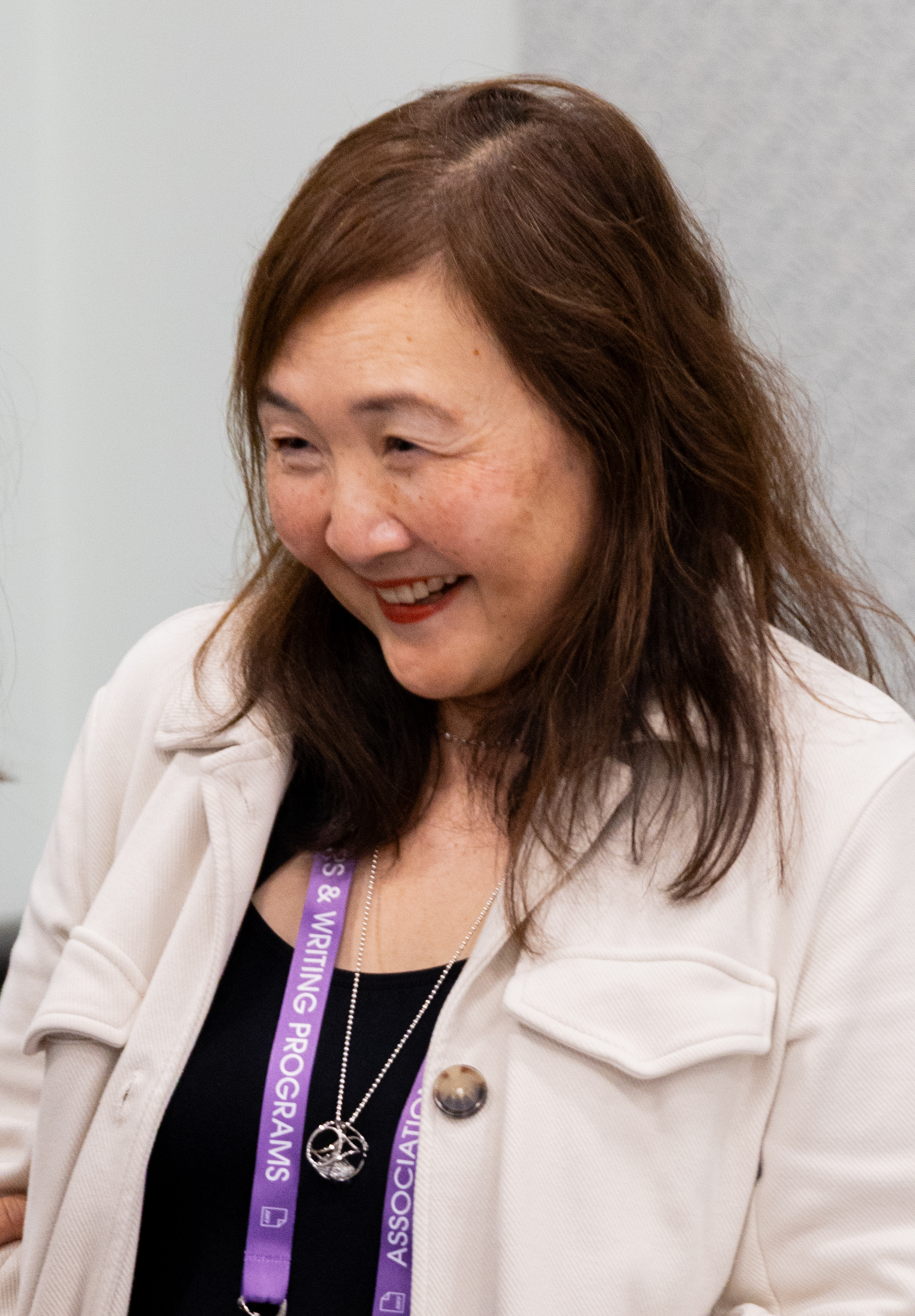
- Han at AWP 2025
- Occupations: Novelist, professor
- Website: jiminhan.net

Jimin Han is an American novelist and professor. She is the author of The Apology (2023). She teaches at The Writing Institute at Sarah Lawrence College.

== Early life and education ==
Han was born in Seoul, South Korea, and then moved to the United States. She attended Cornell University and then earned an MFA from Sarah Lawrence College in 1998.

== Career ==
Han teaches at The Writing Institute at Sarah Lawrence College.

Han is the author of A Small Revolution (2017), The Apology (2023), and Dreamt I Found You (2026).
